Oba Claudius Dosa Akran was a Nigerian politician and traditional title holder who represented Badagry in parliament in 1951 and held the title of Aholu Jiwa II of Jegba. He was a member of the Action Group during the pre-independence period and was appointed regional Minister of Local Government and Economic Planning in 1952. He was an influential member of the party and was regional Minister of Finance from 1962 to 1966.

Akran was born in 1899 in the family of Kopon, who acted as head of Jegba quarters of Badagry. At the behest of a catholic priest, he was permitted by his father to attend school, Akran attended St Gregory's College, Obalende and finished secondary education at King's College. He worked for the Post and Telegraph development for a number of years, joining the department in 1926 and leaving in 1947. Upon the death of his father in 1946, he was nominated as head of Jegba quarters in 1948 and appointed in 1950. As Oba Akran of Badagry, he was a member and later president of Badagry Town Council and Egun-Awori Native Authority.

Akran influenced the establishment of Badagry Grammar School in 1955, the first secondary school in Badagry and other infrastructural development in Badagry such as post and telegraph, electrical and road facilities.

References

Nigerian politicians